Wilson Bugembe is a Ugandan gospel musician and pastor at "Light the World Ministries" in Nansana Wakiso District, Uganda.

Early life and education
Bugembe was born in 1984 Masaka to Mr and Mrs Kirabira. Bugembe was orphaned at an early age that saw him live part of his life on the streets. But he was able to attend school up to university where he studied for only one semester and dropped out.

Music
Bugembe started singing professionally when he was 19 years old. He release his first album "Yellow". His break through song was "Njagala Kumanya" which received airplay on top Radio and Television stations in Uganda. He has since had hit songs like "Komawo eka", "Bilibabitya", "Kani", "Bamuyita Yesu", "Yellow", "Lengera Embaata", "Komawo Eka", "Munaabe" and "Ani". He has worked with Sylver Kyagulanyi Icha Kavons and Isaiah Katumwa. He has released a number of albums like "Kani", "Ani", "Lengera Embaata", "Biribabitya" and "Ningirira".

Discography

Albums
Yellow
Njagala Kumanya
Kani, 2010
Ani, 2010
Lengera Embaata, 2011
Biribabitya, 2012
Akawala ako, 2013
Sibiwulira, 2014
wanaza

Awards and recognition
Best Gospel Artist Pearl of Africa Music Awards 2007.
 Best Gospel Single (Komawo Eka) in Pearl of Africa Music Awards 2008.
Best Gospel Artist Pearl of Africa Music Awards 2008.

References 

1984 births
Living people
Ganda people
21st-century Ugandan male singers
Ugandan gospel musicians
People from Masaka District
Kumusha